The Porcelain Doll is a 2005 Hungarian drama film directed by Péter Gárdos. It was entered into the 27th Moscow International Film Festival.

Cast
 Juci Balog
 Juci Barabás
 László Beles
 Lajos Bertók as Tiszt (segment "A bajnok")
 Istvánné Burga
 István Csala
 Sándor Csányi as Csurmándi (segment "Porcelánbaba")
 Ferencné Császár
 Rozál Csótár
 Elemér Czifra

References

External links
 

2005 films
2005 drama films
Hungarian drama films
2000s Hungarian-language films